Potamiou is a village in the Limassol District of Cyprus, located 4 km south of Omodos.
At Potamiou you may visit the ruins of the ancienent church of Agios Mnasonas.

References

Communities in Limassol District